The Qatar national under-18 and under-19 basketball team represents the country in international under-18 and under-19 (under age 18 and under age 19) basketball competitions. It is administrated by the Qatar Basketball Federation.

See also 
 Qatar national basketball team
 Qatar women's national basketball team
 Qatar national under-17 basketball team
 Qatar national 3x3 team

External links
Qatar Basketball Federation
Qatar Basketball Records at FIBA Archive
Asia-basket - Qatari Men National Team U18/19
Presentation on Facebook

References 

National youth sports teams of Qatar
Men's national under-19 basketball teams